UKS or uks may refer to:

 UKS, the IATA code for Sevastopol International Airport, Belbek, Crimea
 uks, the ISO 639-3 code for Ka'apor Sign Language, Maranhão, Brazil
 Umayalpuram K. Sivaraman, Indian mridangam player